Gwilym Tew (fl. 1460 – 1480) was a Welsh-language poet and manuscript copyist from Tir Iarll, Glamorgan.

It is probable that his father was the poet Rhys Brydydd and that another poet of the same family, Rhisiart ap Rhys, was his nephew.

Notes

15th-century deaths
People from Bridgend County Borough
People from Neath Port Talbot
Year of birth unknown
15th-century Welsh poets
Welsh male poets